Concord Township is a township in Louisa County, Iowa.

History
Concord Township was organized in 1853 as a division of Fredonia Township, Louisa County, Iowa.

References

Townships in Louisa County, Iowa
Townships in Iowa